Gäddvik is a rural village on both sides of the Lule River right west of Bergnäset in the Nederludeå socken in Luleå Municipality, Sweden. The sides of the village are called Södra Gäddvik and Norra Gäddvik. A part of Södra Gäddvik is classified as an area simply called Gäddvik. 53 of the 114 inhabitants of the village (2010) live there. Norra Gäddvik has 61 inhabitants (2010).

History
There has been a national road along Norrlandskusten through Gäddvik since the Middle Ages. A bridge called Gamla Gäddviksbron was built in 1941. In 1978 the traffic on the European route E4 was moved to Nya Gäddviksbron.

Society
There is a Swedish Evangelical Mission garden "Sundet" with camping facilities in summer time in Gäddvik.

Populated places in Luleå Municipality
Villages in Sweden